The Frauen DFB-Pokal 2001–02 was the 22nd season of the cup competition. Germany's second-most important title in women's football. The first round of the competition began on 22 September 2001. In the final which was held in Berlin on 11 May 2002 FFC Frankfurt defeated Hamburg 5–0, thus claiming their fourth title, all consecutive.

1st round

FFC Frankfurt's 20–0 victory over Karlsruher SC is tied for the highest victory ever in the cup.

* FFC Flaesheim-Hillen was declared insolvent after the 2000–01 season. One team thus had to receive a bye which was HSV Borussia Friedenstal.

2nd round

Quarter-finals

Semi-finals

Final

References

DFB-Pokal Frauen seasons
Pokal
Fra